Bulkeley Methodist Church is in Wrexham Road in the village of Bulkeley, Cheshire, England.  It is recorded in the National Heritage List for England as a designated Grade II listed building.

History

The church is dated 1861.  It was originally called the Jubilee Primitive Methodist Chapel.

Architecture

The building is constructed in red brick on a stone plinth with a slate roof.  Despite its date, the architectural style is Georgian.  It has a rectangular plan in two bays orientated north–south.  The entrance is on the south side and contains a doorcase above which is a fanlight. This is flanked by round-headed sash windows.   Above these is a pediment containing a panel with the original name of the church and its date.  There are similar sash windows along the sides of the church. Inside the church is a reredos containing a three-arched arcade. The pulpit is hexagonal.  The listing describes it as "an intact and pleasing example of a small chapel of the date".
This is being purchased and converted into a domestic dwelling.

See also

Listed buildings in Bulkeley

References

Methodist churches in Cheshire
Grade II listed churches in Cheshire
Churches completed in 1861
Georgian architecture in Cheshire
1861 establishments in England